The Beggars Chorus OR The Jovial Crew is an English broadside ballad from the mid-18th century. It celebrates the life of a beggar, and treats begging as a legitimate English trade. Sung to the tune of A Begging We Will Go. Copies of the broadside can be found in the British Library, the National Library of Scotland, and the Huntington Library.

Synopsis 
This ballad tells the story of a beggar who was born lame and has a wooden leg. The beggar sings of his food, his drinks, and his dog. He sings of going to Pimlico with his fellow beggars, where they will all have drinks with girls. He brags of his skills as a beggar, and his ability to evoke pity in others. He lives in a hollowed out tree, and wonders why anybody would be a king when a beggar's life is so good.

Historical and Cultural Significance 
Joseph Woodfall Ebsworth attributes the song to Richard Brome, from his 1642 play, A Jovial Crew, or the Merry Beggars. However, the words to the song do not appear in the first printed version of the play (1652). However, the tune was well known before 1660, when it was used for the political ballad, Colonel John Okie's Lamentation. Ebsworth tells us that the first known printed copy of the words was published in Wit and Mirth in 1684.

William Chappell argues that the song must have been improvised by an actor in the play, since it wasn't included in the first printed version. He also tells us that it was the archetype for a number of parodies: "A-bowling we will go," "A-hawking we will go," "A-fishing we will go," and "A-hunting we will go." The hunting version was especially popular under the name The Stag Chase in The Musical Miscellany (1731). A-Hunting We Will Go is attributed Thomas Arne, who wrote it for John Gay's The Beggar's Opera (1777).

Robert Ford prints a Scottish song, A-Begging We Will Go in his Vagabond Songs. He attributes the Scottish version to Alexander Ross, but tells us that the only similarity to the English version is the refrain and the measure. He attributes the English version to Richard Brome

Ebsworth attributes the tone of Robert Burns' 1785 The Jolly Beggars: A Cantata and Matthew Arnold's The Scholar Gipsy (1853) directly to The Beggars Chorus.

Also known as A Begging We Will Go, and The Begging Song.

The Beggars Chorus and A Begging We Will Go Recordings 
 Martin Carthy on his debut eponymous album, Martin Carthy (1965), accompanied by Dave Swarbrick. In 1990, the duo rewrote the song for their live album, Life and Limb. In the Life and Limb liner notes, Carthy and Swarbrick note that the rise of beggars on the streets in the 1990s is a political reason for revisiting the song.
 Harry Boardman recorded To The Begging on the compilation album, New Voices (1965) on Topic Records. 
 Enoch Kent recorded Tae the Begging for the Topic Records compilation, New Voices From Scotland (1965)  
 Ewan MacColl on The Manchester Angel (1966).
 Bob Davenport on Down the Long Road (1975)
 The Battlefield Band recorded Tae the Begging on At the Front (1978)
 Bob Fox and Stu Luckley on Nowt So Good'll Pass (1978). They re-recorded the song for Box of Gold (1997).
 Maddy Prior and the Carnival Band on Hang Up Sorrow and Care (1995).
 The Rakes on The Red-Haired Lad (1997)
 Frankie Armstrong and Brian Pearson on The Garden of Love (1999).
 Magpie Lane on Six For Gold (2002). In the liner notes, Magpie Lane calls A Begging We Will Go a "staple" of the English and Scottish folk revivals. She argues that beggars are portrayed as lazy and dirty in the popular press, whereas musicians and artists have tended to take a more romantic, or bohemian, view of begging.
 Bellowhead on Hedonism (2010).
 Jon Boden on A Folk Song a Day (2010).

References

External links 
 Richard Brome On-Line: A Jovial Crew, OR The Merry Beggars
 Mainly Norfolk: English Folk and Other Good Music
 A Folk Song a Day
 The Beggars Chorus English Broadside Ballad Archive:On-line facsimiles of the ballad

English broadside ballads
18th-century songs